KXKX (105.7 FM) is a radio station located in Knob Noster, Missouri in the United States. The station is popularly known as KIX 105-7.

History of call letters
The call letters KXKX were previously assigned to an AM station in Kansas City. It replaced KITE on July 19, 1942.

References

External links
Official website
 

Country radio stations in the United States
Pettis County, Missouri
XKX
Townsquare Media radio stations